Sebastián Matos (born September 19, 1984 in Castelli, Argentina) is an Argentine footballer who currently pays for Comunicaciones.

Club career
Matos joined Barracas Central from Los Andes in 2010.

References

External links
 
 Sebastián Matos at playmakerstats.com (English version of ceroacero.es)
 

1984 births
Living people
Argentine footballers
Argentine expatriate footballers
Association football forwards
Sportspeople from Buenos Aires Province
Club Atlético Los Andes footballers
Club Atlético Platense footballers
Chacarita Juniors footballers
Club Atlético Atlanta footballers
C.D. Huachipato footballers
Dorados de Sinaloa footballers
Nueva Chicago footballers
Atlético Tucumán footballers
Club Almirante Brown footballers
Flandria footballers
Gimnasia y Esgrima de Mendoza footballers
San Martín de Tucumán footballers
Club Comunicaciones footballers
Primera Nacional players
Ascenso MX players
Primera B Metropolitana players
Argentine expatriate sportspeople in Chile
Argentine expatriate sportspeople in Mexico
Expatriate footballers in Chile
Expatriate footballers in Mexico